Eleanor Lynn DeGarmo (born August 29, 1994) is a goalie in the Women's Professional Lacrosse League and former goalie for the Princeton University women's lacrosse team.

Early years 
DeGarmo grew up in Baltimore, Maryland. She was born to Sarah Finlayson and Lindley DeGarmo, who is a Presbyterian minister. DeGarmo attended Bryn Mawr High School, a private, K-12 prep school, in Baltimore, Maryland.

At Princeton University, she studies public policy at the Woodrow Wilson School of Public and International Affairs.

College career 
In the fall of her junior year at Bryn Mawr, DeGarmo committed to play for the Princeton University women's lacrosse team.

Sophomore year (2015) 

DeGarmo made the Ivy League All-Tournament Team and was named Ivy League Defensive Player of the Week. She started all 20 games and made 134 saves (46.8% save percentage).

Junior year (2016) 
DeGarmo was unanimously named Ivy League Defender of the Year, earning first-team, all-Ivy honors. A Tewaaraton Trophy top-25 finalist, she led the nation with a 55.7% regular season save percentage.

DeGarmo was named Ivy League Defensive Player of the Week three times. She received them after stopping career-highs of 13, 14, and 16 shots against UVA, Harvard, and Cornell, respectively. She started all 15 games, and has made 157 saves (55.7% save percentage).

Senior year (2017) 
For the second year in a row, DeGarmo was unanimously named Ivy League Defender of the Year, earning first-team, all-Ivy honors. A Tewaaraton Trophy top-25 finalist, she led the nation with a 55.4% regular season save percentage with an average of 12.57 saves per game. With 235 saves over the season, DeGarmo set the single-season save record for Princeton.

References

American lacrosse players
Living people
Princeton Tigers women's lacrosse players
1994 births